The 2014 National Hurling League was the 83rd staging of the National Hurling League. The league began on 15 February.
The divisional stage of the competition finished on 23 March.

In the final played on 4 May at Semple Stadium, Kilkenny defeated Tipperary by 2-25 1-27 with TJ Reid getting the winning point in the last minute of extra-time.	
Tipperary had led by 1-11 to 1-9 at half time, the Tipperary goal coming from John O'Dwyer when he connected with Noel McGrath's sideline cut to touch the ball to the net from the edge of the square. The game finished in a draw at 2-17 to 1-20 after 70 minutes with injury time points for Tipperary from Shane Bourke and Kieran Bergin sending the game to extra time.		
Both goals for Kilkenny came from penalties and both scored by TJ Reid and the sides were level 11 times.

Format

Division 1A: Top four teams qualify for NHL quarter-finals. Bottom two teams play a relegation playoff, with the losing team relegated to Division 1B.
Division 1B: Top team promoted to 1A. Top four teams qualify for NHL quarter-finals. Bottom two teams play a relegation playoff, with the losing team playing a promotion-relegation match against the Division 2A champions.
Division 2A: Top two teams play Division 2A final, with the winning team playing a promotion-relegation match against the loser of the Division 1B relegation playoff. Bottom team relegated to Division 2B.
Division 2B: Top two teams play division final, with the winner being promoted. Bottom two teams play a relegation playoff, with the losing team playing a promotion-relegation match against the Division 3A champions.
Division 3A: Top two teams play Division 3A final, with the winning team playing a promotion-relegation match against the loser of the Division 2B relegation playoff. Bottom team relegated to Division 3B.
Division 3B: Top two teams play division final, with the winner being promoted.

Division 1A

Division 1A

Fixtures and results

Top scorers

Season

Single game

Division 1B

Division 1B

Fixtures and results

Top scorers

Season

Single game

Division 1 Knockout

Quarter-finals

Semi-finals

Division 1 final

Division 2A

Division 2A

Fixtures and results

Top scorers

Season

Single game

Division 2B

Division 2B

Fixtures and results

Top scorers

Season

Single game

Division 3A

Division 3A

Fixtures and results

Top scorers

Season

Division 3B

Division 3B

Fixtures and results

Top scorers

Season

Tickets
The GAA announced in January 2014 that tickets purchased before the day of the games would cost €10, a reduction of €3 from previous seasons, whereas the cost of entry on the day of the game would be raised to €15.

References

 
National Hurling League seasons